The Statute Law Revision (Pre-Union Irish Statutes) Act 1962 (No 29) is an Act of the Oireachtas.

The Act repealed various Acts of the pre-Union Parliament of Ireland, passed from 1459 to 1800, either wholly or in part, including the Crown of Ireland Act 1542 making the king of England also king of Ireland, the Counties of Leix and Offaly Act 1556 declaring the title of the crown to those counties, and various Acts of Supremacy and Uniformity, and the Irish version of the Act of Union 1800.  Some of the equivalent English and British Acts which also applied to Ireland were not explicitly repealed in the Republic of Ireland until later statute law revision Acts (the British version of the Act of Union in the Statute Law Revision Act 1983), even though their application had been overtaken by events.

This Act has not been amended.

See also

Statute Law Revision Act

References

Parliamentary debates:
First stage - Dáil Éireann, volume 196, 11 July 1962
Second and subsequent stages - Dáil Éireann, volume 197, 6 November 1962
Second and subsequent stages - Seanad Éireann, volume 55, 14 November 1962

External links
The Statute Law Revision (Pre-Union Irish Statutes) Act 1962, from the Irish Statute Book.

1962 in Irish law
Acts of the Oireachtas of the 1960s
Ireland and the Commonwealth of Nations
Statute Law Revision 1962